The Magician's Elephant is the thirteenth book written by American author Kate DiCamillo. It was released on September 8, 2009, and illustrated by Yoko Tanaka.

Synopsis 
Peter Augustus Duchene has many questions, but there is one he wishes most answered: "Is his sister still alive? And if so, how he can find her?" The answer he finds from the fortuneteller in the market square of the city of Baltese is one he has to learn to believe. "An elephant! An elephant will lead him there!"

"Light & Night" 
As part of the book's promotion, Candlewick commissioned a song from the indie band Tally Hall and singer-songwriter Nellie McKay. The song, called "Light & Night", was included as a download code with copies of the book purchased at Walmart stores. In 2022, Needlejuice Records rereleased Light & Night on a vinyl single backed with Turn The Lights Off, to accompany their reissue of Good & Evil.

Characters
 Peter Augustus Duchene is a boy who lost his mother and father. He is being trained to become a soldier by his guardian, Vilna Lutz. He promised his mother he would take care of his sister. He is really smart and caring and also kind. He believes that the elephant will lead him to his sister.
 Vilna Lutz is a soldier who was Peter's father's friend and marched beside him. He is Peter's guardian and tells him that his sister is dead.
 Adele is Peter's younger long-lost six-year-old sister. Her mother dies right after she is born. She grows up not knowing her brother and living in at the Orphanage of the Sisters of Perpetual Light, where she dreams about an elephant coming to get there. In the end, she is reunited with Peter.
 The Magician made the elephant appear from the ceiling, though he claims he only intended lilies. He goes to prison for handicapping Madam LaVaughn with his elephant and looks to a star which is actually Venus. In the end, he is married to a toothless woman and it is revealed his name is Frederick. 
 Leo Matienne is a police officer and lives in the apartment below Vilna Lutz's apartment. He lives with his wife, Gloria, and although he is unable to have any children of his own, he ends up adopting Peter and Adele. 
 Madam LaVaughn is a woman whose legs are broken by the elephant which is summoned by the magician. She ends up forgiving him.
 Hans Eckman is Madam LaVaughn's manservant. He recalls having a dog that could jump across a river, but cannot remember the name.
 Tomas is a beggar who owns the blind dog, Iddo. He is known for his singing.
 Bartok Wynn used to sculpt gargoyles until he fell off, which made him hunch over. He has a spontaneous tendency to laugh, and he works as the caretaker for the elephant.

Adaptations

Stage adaptation 

A stage musical version by Nancy Harris and Marc Teitler made its debut at the Royal Shakespeare Company during their winter 2021 season.

Film adaptation 

It was reported in 2009 that Fox planned to adapt The Magician's Elephant into a film to be produced by Julia Pistor. On December 15, 2020, Netflix acquired the rights for an animated feature film adaptation of the book, with Wendy Rogers set to direct it and Julia Pistor set to produce it. On the same day, Netflix also announced Noah Jupe, Benedict Wong, Pixie Davies, Sian Clifford, Brian Tyree Henry, Mandy Patinkin, Natasia Demetriou, Dawn French, Aasif Mandvi, and Miranda Richardson had joined the cast of the film.

References

External links

 
 Candlewick Press entry

2009 American novels
2009 children's books
2009 fantasy novels
American children's novels
Candlewick Press books
Children's fantasy novels
American fantasy novels adapted into films
Novels about orphans
Books about elephants
Novels about magic